Tawfeek Barhom (born 1990) is a Palestinian actor. He had a leading role in A Borrowed Identity, The Idol, and Wounded Land.

Selected filmography

Film

Television

References

External links 

1990 births
Living people
Israeli male film actors
Arab citizens of Israel
Arab actors
Israeli people of Palestinian descent